Fanny Eliza Arden (– 13 June 1955) was a New Zealand artist.

Biography 
Fanny Eliza Arden was born circa. 1859 to Henry Godfrey. She was the second wife of New Zealand artist, Francis Hamar Arden on 7 September 1887 and together they had three children: Captain Henry Neville (5 January 1889 – 4 October 1917), Phyllis Godfrey (1892) and Frances Jean (1895).

She was taught to paint by her husband, and many of her paintings were donated to the Govett-Brewster Art Gallery. Several of her paintings now are in Puke Ariki and the Auckland Art Gallery. In January 2020, her watercolour, Mt Egmont, sold for NZ$425 at Dunbar Sloane Wellington.

Arden died on 13 June 1955. She was buried at Hurdon Cemetery in New Plymouth. Her husband had died before her on 19 December 1899.

References

External links 

 Untitled Painting in Puke Ariki by Fanny Eliza Arden
 Mt Egmont by Fanny Eliza Ardern

19th-century New Zealand women artists
1859 births
1955 deaths
20th-century New Zealand women artists
19th-century New Zealand painters
20th-century New Zealand painters